The Galician Nationalist Party–Galicianist Party (PNG–PG) is a Galician nationalist and liberal political party, coming from a split of the Galician Coalition. The PNG–PG had 132 members in 2002 (the party had more than 500 shortly after its founding). Xosé Mosquera Casero is its secretary general, after the VIII Congress in September 2011.

History
Founded in January 1987 as the Galician Nationalist Party (PNG) when a sector of the Galician Coalition, led by Pablo González Mariñas and Xosé Henrique Rodríguez Peña promoted a more progressive and nationalist organization. The PNG was joined the same year by the small Partido Galeguista (Nationalist), leading to the creation of the PNG–PG. In September 1987, the PNG–PG supported a motion against the Galician president Xerardo Fernández Albor, that led to the fall of the government. The party entered the new socialist government of Fernando González Laxe taking control of two consellerías (autonic ministers).

In 1987 and 1989 participated in the elections to the European Parliament together with Eusko Alkartasuna and the Republican Left of Catalonia without obtaining representation.

Due to the poor results of the elections of 1989 the PNG–PG joined the Galician Nationalist Bloc. After IX National Congress, on 18 March 2012, the party decided to leave the BNG. In late March of that year the party announced that they were working on a common project of a Galician nationalist centre party, along with  Terra Galega (TEGA), Alternativa Popular Galega (APG), Converxencia XXI (CXXI) and the Partido Galeguista Demócrata (PGD). The project did not materialize. After that the PNG-PG joined Compromiso por Galicia.

Elections

References

 Beramendi, X.G. and Núñez Seixas, X.M. (1996): O nacionalismo galego. A Nosa Terra, Vigo
 Beramendi, X.G. (2007): De provincia a nación. Historia do galeguismo político. Xerais, Vigo

External links
Official website 

Political parties in Galicia (Spain)
Secessionist organizations in Europe
Galician nationalism
Political parties established in 1987
Former member parties of the Galician Nationalist Bloc